Jason Douglas King (born November 18, 1993) is an American football guard who is currently a free agent. He played college football at Purdue.

Professional career

New England Patriots
King signed with the New England Patriots as an undrafted free agent on May 5, 2017. He was waived by the Patriots on September 2, 2017. He was re-signed to the practice squad on September 20, 2017. He was released on October 9, 2017.

Baltimore Ravens
On October 31, 2017, King was signed to the Baltimore Ravens' practice squad. He was released on November 14, 2017.

New England Patriots (second stint)
On November 28, 2017, King was signed to the Patriots' active roster. He was waived by the Patriots on December 2, 2017, and was re-signed to New England's practice squad on December 5, 2017. He signed a reserve/future contract with the Patriots on February 6, 2018. He was waived on May 10, 2018, but was re-signed on May 18. He was waived again on September 1, 2018.

Birmingham Iron
In November 2018, King signed with the Birmingham Iron of the Alliance of American Football.

Student-Athlete career

Pulaski Academy
King played high school football for coach Kevin Kelley at Pulaski Academy in Little Rock, Arkansas.  He graduated from Pulaski Academy in the class of 2012.

Purdue
King committed to Purdue on December 26, 2011, and later signed a letter of intent to Purdue on February 1, 2012.  He attended school at Purdue from 2012 until graduating in 2016, having played in 45 games during his collegiate career.

References

External links
Purdue Boilermakers bio

1993 births
Living people
Players of American football from Arkansas
Sportspeople from Little Rock, Arkansas
American football offensive guards
Purdue Boilermakers football players
New England Patriots players
Baltimore Ravens players
Birmingham Iron players